John Farlinger (born March 4, 1948) is a retired Canadian football player who played for the Edmonton Eskimos. He won the Grey Cup with Edmonton in 1975. He played college football at the University of Calgary.

References

1948 births
Living people
Edmonton Elks players
Canadian football defensive backs
Calgary Dinos football players